Horror Zombies from the Crypt is a platform game developed by Millennium Interactive and published by U.S. Gold for Amiga, Atari ST, and DOS.

This game is inspired by 1950s horror movies. The player assumes the role of a Count Frederick Valdemar and enters a mansion full of ghastly creatures such as grim reapers, vampires, zombies and mummies. These creatures will attempt to stop the Count as he ventures through 6 levels in search for skulls. All skulls must be collected before the player may exit the level. Before each level there is an introductory screen which explains the goal of the level.

Music in the game includes Montagues and Capulets, played during the introduction.

External links

1990 video games
Amiga games
Atari ST games
DOS games
Platform games
U.S. Gold games
Video games about zombies
Video games developed in the United Kingdom